Sanders Creek may refer to:

Sanders Creek (Iowa), a stream in Iowa
Sanders Creek (Red River tributary), a stream in Texas